Line is a freeware app for instant communications on electronic devices such as smartphones, tablet computers and personal computers. Line users exchange: texts, images, video and audio and conduct free VoIP conversations and video conferences. In addition, Line is a platform providing various services including: digital wallet as Line Pay, news stream as LINE Today, video on demand as Line TV and digital comic distribution as Line Manga and Line Webtoon. The service is operated by Line Corporation, a Tokyo-based subsidiary of Z Holdings.

Line was launched in Japan in June 2011 by NHN Japan, a subsidiary of Naver Corporation. Because it was tailored to Japanese consumers' tastes and offered free smartphone calls as well as texting, with the help of a massive marketing campaign it quickly outpaced its existing rival KakaoTalk for the Japanese market. It reached 100 million users within 18 months and 200 million users six months later. Line became Japan's largest social network in 2013, with more than 300 million users. By February 2015 it had 600 million users.

In March 2021, SoftBank Group affiliate and Yahoo! Japan operator Z Holdings completed a merger with Line Corporation. Under the new structure, A Holdings, a subsidiary of SoftBank Corporation and Naver Corporation, will own 65.3% of Z Holdings, which will operate Line and Yahoo! Japan. Line is the most popular messaging application in Japan, Taiwan and Thailand.

History 
In South Korea, the home of NHN Japan's parent company Naver Corporation, Naver had launched a messaging app called Naver Talk for the South Korean market in February 2011. However, rival Korean company Kakao had first-mover advantage with its KakaoTalk app launched in March 2010 and easily dominated the Korean market by March 2012.

Naver/NHN co-founder and chairman Lee Hae-Jin and a team of engineers were in Japan when the Tōhoku earthquake and tsunami struck in March 2011. Naver/NHN had been in Japan for ten years, trying to build a Japanese search and portal business, since NHN's other international ventures had stagnated. The earthquake and tsunami left millions without power and phone lines and SMS networks were overwhelmed. Since Wi-Fi and some 3G remained largely usable, many people turned to KakaoTalk, which was just beginning to gain a foothold in Japan. Lee was inspired to launch a messaging and chat app in the wake of the disaster and his NHN Japan team was testing a beta version of an app accessible on smartphones, tablet and PC, which would work on data network and provide continuous and free instant messaging and calling service, within two months. The app was launched as Line in June 2011.

Because Naver/NHN had a far superior cultural knowledge of what Japanese users wanted, and a much larger corporate marketing budget, Line quickly surpassed KakaoTalk in Japan. Line also offers free voice calls and, since Japan's telecoms make customers pay for both SMSs and smartphone calls, this feature, which KakaoTalk did not have, was a major selling point.

The app proved hugely popular, and by late October 2011, Line experienced an unexpected server overload. To improve scalability to accommodate its exponential rise in new users, NHN Japan chose HBase as the primary storage for user profiles, contacts and groups. In December 2011, Naver announced that Naver Talk would be merged into Line, effective early 2012.

In July 2012, NHN Japan announced the new Line features Home and Timeline. The features allowed users to share recent personal developments to a community of contacts in real-time, similar to the status updates in social networking services such as Facebook. On April 1, 2013, Naver's Japanese branch name was changed from NHN Japan to Line Corporation.

Line became Japan's largest social network by the end of 2013, with more than 300 million registrants worldwide, of which more than 50 million users were within Japan. In October 2014, Line announced that it had attracted 560 million users worldwide with 170 million active user accounts. In February 2015, it announced the 600 million users mark had been passed and 700 million were expected by the end of the year.

Line was originally developed as a mobile application for Android and IOS smartphones. The service has since expanded to: BlackBerry OS (August 2012), Nokia Asha (Asia and Oceania, March 2013), Windows Phone (July 2013), Firefox OS (February 2014), IPadOS (October 2014) and as a Chrome Browser Application (via the Chrome Web Store). The application also exists in versions for laptop and desktop computers using the Microsoft Windows and MacOS platforms..

In July 2016, Line Corporation held IPOs on both the New York Stock Exchange and the Tokyo Stock Exchange.

In late December 2020, Line Corporation delisted from both the New York Stock Exchange and the Tokyo Stock Exchange, in advance of its absorption-type merger agreement with Z Holdings.

On March 1, 2021, Line Corporation merged with Yahoo! Japan, which has been operated by Z Holdings, a SoftBank Group subsidiary. Under the new structure, Naver Corporation (Line's former parent company) and SoftBank Corp (the wireless carrier unit of SoftBank Group). Each one hold 50% stakes in a new company named A Holdings Corp., which holds a majority stake in Z Holdings, which now operates Line and Yahoo! Japan. Upon integrating the two businesses and creating further platforms, the merged company aims to compete with the U.S. tech giants: Google, Amazon, Facebook and Apple and the Chinese tech giants Baidu, Alibaba and Tencent, as well as the Japanese e-commerce giant Rakuten. The merger also gives Z Holdings three additional Asian markets where Line is popular: Taiwan, Thailand and Indonesia.

Market share 
Line began in Spring 2011 as a communication system for NHN Japan employees. It then saw explosive growth when released to the public in June of that year. By 18 January 2013, Line had been downloaded 100 million times worldwide. The number expanded to 140 million by early July 2013 and to 200 million by July 21. As of June 2016, Japan claimed 68 million users while Thailand had 33 million. As of February 2014, Indonesia had 20 million users, Taiwan 17 million, while India and Spain had 16 million each. NHN representatives announced plans to reach 300 million by further expansion in East Asia, Spain and Chile. In April 2014, Naver announced that Line had reached 400 million worldwide users and by 2017 this had grown to 700 million.

Features 
Line is an application that works on multiple platforms and has access via multiple personal computers (Microsoft Windows or MacOS). The application will also give an option of address book syncing. This application also has a feature to add friends through the use of QR codes by Line ID and by shaking phones simultaneously. The application has a direct pop-out message box for reading and replying to make it easy for users to communicate. It also can share photos, videos and music with other users, send the current or any specific: locations, voice audios, emojis, stickers and emoticons to friends. Users can see a real-time confirmation when messages are sent and received or use a hidden chat feature, which can hide and delete a chat history (from both involved devices and Line servers) after a time set by the user.

The application also makes free voice and video calls. Users can also chat and share media in a group by creating and joining groups that have up to 500 people. Chats also provide bulletin boards on which users can post, like and comment. This application also has timeline and homepage features that allow users to post pictures, text and stickers on their homepages. Users can also change their Line theme to the theme Line provides in the theme shop for free or users can buy other famous cartoon characters they like. Line also has a feature, called a Snap movie, that users can use to record a stop-motion video and add in provided background music.

In January 2015, Line Taxi was released in Tokyo as a competitor to Uber. Line launched a new android app called "Popcorn buzz" in June 2015. The app facilitates group calls with up to 200 members. In June a new Emoji keyboard was also released for IOS devices, which provides a Line-like experience with the possibility to add stickers. In September 2015 a new Android launcher was released on the Google Play Store, helping the company to promote its own services through the new user interface.

Official channels
Line includes a feature known as "official channels" which allows companies, especially news media outlets, publications and other mass media companies to offer an official channel which users can join and thereby receive regular updates, published articles or news updates from companies or news outlets.

Stickers 
Line features a Sticker Shop where users are able to purchase virtual stickers depicting original and well-known characters. The stickers are used during chat sessions between users and act as large emoji. Users can purchase stickers as gifts, with many stickers available as free downloads, depending on country availability. Purchased stickers are attached to an account and can be used on other platforms. New sticker sets are released weekly. Line's message stickers feature original characters as well as a number of popular manga, anime and gaming characters, movie tie-ins and characters from Disney properties such as Pixar. Some sticker sets, such as those that celebrate special events like the 2012 Summer Olympics, are released for only a limited time. Other sticker sets could also be used to benefit the greater good, known as Charity Stickers. For example, in 2016, Line released "Support Kumamoto" Charity Stickers to provide aid to victims of the 2016 Kumamoto earthquakes. All proceeds earned from the sales of these stickers were to be donated to the Japanese Red Cross Society to provide financial support and aid for the victims.

The original default characters and stickers, known as Line Friends, were created by Kang Byeongmok, also known as "Mogi", in 2011.

There are over 1 billion stickers sent by worldwide users on a daily basis.  The popular characters Milk & Mocha began as stickers on Line in Indonesia.

Games 
NHN Japan created Line Games in 2011. Only those with a Line application account can install and play the games. Players can connect with friends, send and accept items and earn friend points. The game range includes: puzzles, match-three, side-scroller, musical performance, simulation, battle and spot-the-difference games. In September 2013, Line Corporation announced its games had been downloaded 200 million times worldwide.

On July 10, 2017, Line Games acquired NextFloor Corporation, developers of Dragon Flight and Destiny Child. On January 5, 2017, LINE Games was announced as the publisher for Hundred Soul (formerly known as Project 100) by Hound 13.

On December 12, 2018, Line Games held a media event called LPG (Line Games-Play-Game) to introduce its games for 2019. Mobile games announced include: Exos Heroes (by OOZOO), Ravenix: The Card Master (also by OOZOO), Dark Summoners (by SkeinGlobe), Project PK (by Rock Square) and Super String (by Factorial Games). Project NM by Space Dive was also announced for PC. Games to be released on mobile and PC include: Project NL (by MeerKat Games) and Uncharted Waters Origins (by Line Games and Koei Tecmo).

On 10 Jul 2019, Nintendo released Dr. Mario World co-developed by Line Games. On July 18, 2019, First Summoner developed by SkeinGlobe was released.

Line Pay 
Line introduced Line Pay worldwide on December 16, 2014. The service allows users to request and send money from users in their contact list and make mobile payments in store. The service has since expanded to allow other features such as offline wire transfers when making purchases and ATM transactions like depositing and withdrawing money. Unlike other Line services, Line Pay is offered worldwide through the Line app.

Line Taxi 
Line Taxi was launched in January 2015 in partnership with Nihon Kotsu, a local taxi service in Japan. Just like Line Pay, Line Taxi is not offered as a separate app but rather through the Line app where users can request a taxi and automatically pay for it when they connect their account to Line Pay.

Line Wow 
Announced alongside Line Pay and Line Taxi, a service that allows users to instantly access delivery services for registered food or products and services.

Line Today 
A news hub integrated in the Line app.

Line Shopping
A referral program for online shopping. Customers get extra discount or earn Line Points by purchasing through the Line Shopping service.

Line Gift
A gift sending services on Line. Customers can send gift via Line.

Line Doctor 
A matching platform for finding doctors online.

Line Lite 

In 2015, a lower-overhead Android app was released for emerging markets called Line Lite. This supports messages and calls but not themes or timeline.

It became available worldwide in August 2015.

In January 2022 Line announced the discontinuation of Line Lite, taking effect on the 28th February 2022.

Limitations 
Line accounts can be accessed on only one mobile device (running the app version) or one personal computer (running the version for these). Additional mobile devices can install the app but require different mobile numbers or e-mail addresses for the Line account.

If "Line Lite" for Android was installed and activated, the user was told they will be "logged out of the normal Line". This message did not make clear that it was impossible to log back in to the normal Line, which would delete all history data when next launched. Line Lite has now been discontinued.

Security 
In August 2013, it was possible to intercept a Line chat session at the network level using packet capture software and to reconstruct it on a PC. Messages were sent in cleartext to Line's server when on cellular data but encrypted when using Wi-Fi most of the time.

Until February 2016, it was also possible to "clone" an iPhone from a backup and then use the "cloned" iPhone to access the same Line account as used by the original iPhone. This loophole was widely rumored (but never proven) to have been used to intercept Line messages between the popular Japanese television personality Becky and her married romantic partner Enon Kawatani; the intercepted messages were published in the magazine Shukan Bunshun and led to the temporary suspension of Becky's television career.

In July 2016, Line Corporation turned on end-to-end encryption by default for all Line users. It had earlier been available as an opt-in feature since October 2015. The app uses the ECDH protocol for client-to-client encryption. In August 2016, Line expanded its end-to-end encryption to also encompass its group chats, voice calls and video calls.

In March 2021, the Japanese government announced that it would investigate Line after reports that it let Chinese system-maintenance engineers in Shanghai access Japanese users' data without informing them, beginning in August 2018. Four Chinese engineers in a Shanghai-based affiliate that Line subcontracted to develop AI accessed the messages stored in the Japanese computer system and personal information of Line users, such as: name, phone number, email address and Line ID. Photos and video footage posted by Japanese users were also stored on a server in South Korea. Line stated in March 2021 that it had since blocked access to user data at the Chinese affiliate and that it would revise its privacy policy and make it more explicit. Line had been used by the Japanese government and local governments to notify residents about developments in dealing with the coronavirus pandemic. In response to the reports of security issues, the national government and many local governments halted their usage of Line in late March 2021. In April 2021 the government ordered Line to take measures to properly protect customers' information and to report improvement measures within a month. Line also relocated image and other data stored in South Korea to Japan. As of November 2021, the Tokyo metropolitan government offers proof of COVID-19 vaccinations through the Line app, with expansion planned for other prefectures.

On 12 April 2021, Line suffered a large-scale crash in Taiwan. Unconfirmed reports suggest that Roman Matovsky hacked the company's servers because of a personal conflict with the company. He wrote about it on his personal blog shortly after the platform's services resumed, asserting why and what he claimed happened and additionally left comments consistent with this in his social network profiles, which he subsequently removed the next day.

More than 70,000 LINE Pay users in Taiwan have been affected by a leak of transaction information during the period from December 26, 2020, to April 2, 2021.

Censorship 
Line suppressed content in China to conform with government censorship. Analysis by Citizen Lab showed that accounts registered with Chinese phone numbers download a list of banned words that cannot be sent or received through Line.

Line publicly confirmed the practice in December 2013. However, by 2014, access to Line chat servers has been entirely blocked by the Great Firewall, while the company still makes revenue in China from brick-and-mortar stores.

In Indonesia, Line has responded to pressure from the Indonesian Communication and Information Ministry to remove emojis and stickers it believes make reference to homosexuality, for example the emoji "two men holding hands". Line issued a public statement on the issue: "Line regrets the incidents of some stickers which are considered sensitive by many people. We ask for your understanding because at the moment we are working on this issue to remove the stickers".

In Thailand, Line is suspected of responding to pressure from the Thai government and, after previously approving 'Red Buffalo' stickers, which had been used to refer to the Red Shirts political faction, including by the Red Shirts themselves, removed the stickers.

In Russia, on 28 April 2017, Russia's Federal Service for Supervision of Communications, Information Technology and Mass Media, placed LINE on a banned list. Telecommunications companies appear to have taken steps in May to progressively block access to LINE and other services using smartphones. The Russian Internet Regulation Law obliges social network operators to store personal information of their Russian customers in the country and submit it if requested by the authorities; LINE is believed to have been found to be in breach of this provision. According to reports, BBM, Imo.im and Vchat have been newly added to the list of banned services, in addition to LINE. On 3 May 2017 access to Line chat servers was entirely blocked by the Roskomnadzor and the Line servers were added to the Unified Register of Banned Sites, after which Russian users began to experience problems receiving and sending messages.

In popular culture 
On November 20, 2012, Line was shown in Far East Movement's music video, featuring Sidney Samson, for the song "Change Your Life". DJ Virman is seen chatting with Sidney Samson at the middle of the music video.

On December 16, 2012, the Line application was shown in American rap artist Big Sean's music video for the song "Guap".

On May 16, 2014, Warner Music Italy released the music video for Italian singer Annalisa's "Sento solo il presente", in which the recording artist is seen using the Line application at the beginning of the video.

Since Line has become ubiquitous in Japan, its usage is depicted with relative frequency in anime, dramas, and other pop culture. For example, in the 2017 anime Tsuki ga Kirei, the Line app is the protagonists' main way of communication.

Related products

Line Friends 

Line Friends are featured characters that are shown in stickers of the application. They include Brown, Cony, Sally, James, Moon, Boss, Jessica, Edward, Leonard, Choco, Pangyo and Rangers. Two anime series, Line Offline and Line Town, were produced in 2013, picturing the Line Friends as employees for the fictional Line Corporation.

Line Man 
On-demand assistant for food and messenger delivery services in Bangkok.

Line TV 

A video on demand service operating in Taiwan and Thailand.

Stores 
There are physical stores in Japan, South Korea, China, Taiwan, Hong Kong, Thailand, U.S. and a Korean online store to purchase Line Friends merchandise. Occasionally, Line will have pop-up or temporary stores globally.

See also 

 Comparison of cross-platform instant messaging clients
Comparison of instant messaging protocols
Comparison of Internet Relay Chat clients
Comparison of LAN messengers
Comparison of VoIP software
List of SIP software
List of video telecommunication services and product brands

References

External links 
 

Android (operating system) software
IOS software
Mobile payments
BlackBerry software
SoftBank Group
Symbian software
Instant messaging clients
Cross-platform software
Communication software
VoIP software
Windows Phone software
2011 software
Universal Windows Platform apps